Kang So-ra (born February 18, 1990) is a South Korean actress.

Career
Kang made her acting debut in the 2009 thriller movie 4th Period Mystery, but  rose to fame when she starred in the 2011 blockbuster Sunny, a coming-of-age film about a group of high school girls growing up in the 1980s. This was followed by leading roles in television dramas, such as teen musical Dream High 2 (2012), and family drama Ugly Alert (2013). Kang also appeared on the third season of We Got Married, a reality show which pairs up celebrities into fake "married" couples; her partner was Leeteuk from the K-pop group Super Junior.

Kang gained increased recognition after starring in two hit series in 2014; medical drama Doctor Stranger (2014) and workplace dramedy Misaeng: Incomplete Life (2014); Doctor Stranger was a success in China with 400 million views and Misaeng: Incomplete Life was dubbed a "cultural phenomenon" in South Korea.
This was followed by lead roles in romantic comedy Warm and Cozy (2015) together with Yoo Yeon-seok,  legal drama My Lawyer, Mr. Jo (2016), and romantic comedy Revolutionary Love (2017) alongside Choi Si-won from the k-pop group Super Junior.

In 2019, Kang returned to the big screen in the cycling film Uhm Bok-dong.

In 2020, Kang starred in the comedy film Secret Zoo, based on the webtoon of the same name. She plays a veterinarian who pretends to be a lion. The same year, she was cast in the romance melodrama film Waiting for Rain.

Personal life 
Kang married a doctor of Oriental medicine in August 2020 in a private ceremony. On November 19, 2020, it was announced that Kang is pregnant with their first child, due in April  2021.

On April 15, 2021, Kang's agency announced that Kang had given birth to her daughter.

Filmography

Film

Television series

Television shows

Hosting

Music video appearances

Discography

Singles

Ambassadorial roles

Awards and nominations

Listicles

References

External links

South Korean film actresses
South Korean television actresses
1990 births
Living people
Dongguk University alumni